La Caravana del manuscrito andalusí is a 2007 documentary film directed by Lidia Peralta García.

Synopsis 
During the 12th and 15th centuries, in Muslim Spain, many science books were written. When Muslims left Spain, many took their manuscripts with them. Today, one can find them spread in particular libraries, all along the caravan route through Morocco, Mauritania and Mali. From Toledo to Timbuktu, this documentary follows their traces. Its protagonist, Ismael Diadié Haidara, owner of the Andalus Library of Timbuktu, has spent years trying to retrieve his family's manuscripts and with them, his own Al Andalus past.

Production

The film was produced with the assistance of CEDECOM Malaga.
According to Peralta, "a documentary like this makes you very aware that for many centuries we have shared the same history, while today some have white skin and others black".

Awards

La Caravana del manuscrito andalusí won the Best Documentary Film prize at the 10th International Panorama of Independent Films.
It was also nominated for Best Documentary Film at the 2008 Marbella International Film Festival.

See also
List of Islam-related films

References 

2007 films
Spanish documentary films
2007 documentary films
Documentary films about Islam
Documentary films about the history of science
Science in the medieval Islamic world
History of Al-Andalus
Historiography of Spain
2000s Spanish films